Cara Black and Sania Mirza were the defending champions but they chose not to participate.
Garbiñe Muguruza and Carla Suárez Navarro won the title, defeating Chan Hao-ching and Chan Yung-jan in the final, 7–5, 6–1.

Seeds

Draw

References 
 Draw

Toray Pan Pacific Open - Doubles
2015 Doubles
2015 Toray Pan Pacific Open